Rumaan Alam (born 1977) is an American writer.

He studied writing at Oberlin College. He is the author of three novels: Leave the World Behind, That Kind of Mother, and Rich and Pretty. He also hosts two podcasts for Slate.

Leave the World Behind (novel) was acclaimed by book critics and nominated for the 2020 National Book Award.

Works

Books

 2016: Rich and Pretty (novel)
 2018: That Kind of Mother (novel)
 2020: Leave the World Behind (novel)
 2024: Entitlement (novel)

References

1977 births
Living people
21st-century American novelists
American male novelists
Place of birth missing (living people)
American writers of Bangladeshi descent
Oberlin College alumni
American podcasters
21st-century American male writers